Paolo Donati (born 22 January 1962) is a former Italian male long-distance runner who competed at three editions of the IAAF World Cross Country Championships at senior level (1992, 1993, 1994). He won one national championships at senior level (10,000 metres: 1992).

References

External links
 

1962 births
Living people
Italian male long-distance runners